The Squaw Valley Olympic Skating Rink was a temporary venue constructed for the 1960 Winter Olympics in Olympic Valley, California (which was known at that time as "Squaw Valley"). Located outdoors near the Blyth Arena, it hosted the speed skating and some of the ice hockey events for those games. The site has been re-developed as parking and mixed residential-retail complex.

References
1960 Winter Olympics official report. p. 121.

Venues of the 1960 Winter Olympics
Olympic speed skating venues
Olympic ice hockey venues
Defunct sports venues in California
Speed skating venues in the United States
Sports venues in Placer County, California